Secret Agents, also released as Spy Bound, is a 2004 French crime film directed by Frédéric Schoendoerffer.

Plot
DGSE field agents plan and execute a mission to Morocco that encounters problems, with one agent imprisoned.

Cast 
 Vincent Cassel - Brisseau 
 Monica Bellucci - Barbara / Lisa 
 André Dussollier - Colonel Grasset 
 Charles Berling - Eugène 
 Bruno Todeschini - Homme maigre en civil
 Sergio Peris-Mencheta - Raymond
 Ludovic Schoendoerffer - Loic
 Eric Savin - Tony
 Najwa Nimri - Maria Menendez
 Rosanna Walls - Maria's friend
 Beatrice Kessler - Helena Standler
 Jo Prestia - Gianni
 Serge Avedikian - Igor Lipovsky 
 Gabriel'e Lazure - Veronique Lipovsky
 Simón Andreu - Maître Deligny

References

External links 

2000s spy films
French spy films
Films directed by Frédéric Schoendoerffer
2000s French films